Diana B. Archangeli (born in Oregon in 1953) is an American linguist and Professor at the Department of Linguistics at the University of Arizona.

She earned her M.A. at the University of Texas-Austin in 1981, and her PhD from MIT in 1984, with a dissertation entitled, "Underspecification in Yawelmani Phonology and Morphology."  Her dissertation was selected for publication in Garland's Outstanding Dissertation series (Archangeli 1988).

She taught at the University of Illinois at Urbana-Champaign for a year before joining the faculty at the University of Arizona in 1985. She also spent a few years teaching at the University of Hong Kong (2013-2017).

She is known for a number of widely cited works on phonetics and phonology, often in collaboration with Douglas Pulleyblank (UBC), within the frameworks of Grounded Phonology, Emergent Phonology and underspecification.

Books
 Archangeli, Diana & Pulleyblank, Douglas. 1994. Grounded Phonology. MIT Press
 Optimality Theory: An Overview, edited with D. T. Langendoen, University of Arizona, 1997, Blackwells Publishing, Oxford
 Underspecification in Yawelmani Phonology and Morphology, 1988, Garland Publishing, New York
 Archangeli, Diana & Pulleyblank, Douglas. 2022. Emergent phonology. (Conceptual Foundations of Language Science 7). Berlin: Language Science Press. DOI: 10.5281/zenodo.5721159

References

External links
Diana Archangeli

Phonologists
Living people
Linguists from the United States
Women linguists
Phoneticians
University of Arizona faculty
University of Texas at Austin alumni
Massachusetts Institute of Technology alumni
Morphologists
1953 births